Stare Czaple may refer to the following places:
Stare Czaple, Lubusz Voivodeship (west Poland)
Stare Czaple, Opole Voivodeship (south-west Poland)
Stare Czaple, Pomeranian Voivodeship (north Poland)